3-hydroxyacyl-CoA dehydratase 2 is a protein that in humans is encoded by the HACD2 gene.

Function

The protein encoded by this gene can catalyze the third step (dehydration) in the conversion of long chain fatty acids to very long chain fatty acids. The encoded protein localizes to the endoplasmic reticulum membrane.

References

Further reading